Petra Nows (born 23 June 1953) is a German former swimmer. She competed in the women's 200 metre breaststroke at the 1972 Summer Olympics.

References

External links
 

1953 births
Living people
German female swimmers
Olympic swimmers of West Germany
Swimmers at the 1972 Summer Olympics
Sportspeople from Duisburg
German female breaststroke swimmers
World Aquatics Championships medalists in swimming
20th-century German women
21st-century German women